Carl Johan Michelet (25 July 1826 - 30 January 1902) was a Norwegian lawyer and civil servant. He served as Mayor of Oslo and was elected as a member of the Norwegian Parliament (Storting).

Biography 
He was born at Aurskog in Akershus, Norway. His parents were Christian Frederik Michelet (1792-1874) and Edle Michaeline (1804-1892). His father was a Major General in the Norwegian military. He attended the University of Christiania and took the Norwegian bar exam in 1849. He was an associate for seven years until he became permitted to practice law (overrettssakførar) in Christiania (now Oslo).

He was a police chief of Christiania from 1863 to 1870 and was a member of the Royal Commission of the Police in 1864.
Michelet served on the presidency of the city of Oslo from 1862 and was appointed mayor during the period 1866–68. He was a member of the city council until 1882.
He was also elected to the Norwegian Parliament as a representative of Jarlsberg and Larvik County (Jarlsberg og Larviks amt) from 1886 to 1891, then from 1895 to 1901.

Personal life 
Michelet was married in 1853 to Olava Emilie Mathea Buhring (1826-1879) with whom he had three children. They were the parents of Christian Fredrik Michelet (1860–1935) who was an equestrian and military officer.
After her death, he was married in 1882 with Johanne Bruun (1840-1887).
Michelet was awarded a number of honours, including the Grand Cross of the Order of St. Olav in 1901. He died in Christiania.

References

Other Sources 
 Finne-Grønn, S. H. Slegten Michelet: genealogisk-personalhistoriske meddelelser, med vaabentegninger, facsimiler og portrætter (Christiania, 1919)
 Lindstøl, Tallak Stortinget og Statsraadet 1814-1914 (Kristiania, 1914)
 Johnsen, Oscar Albert Sem og Slagen. En bygdebok (Tønsberg, 1945–48)

1826 births
1902 deaths
People from Akershus
University of Oslo alumni
Norwegian police chiefs
Mayors of Oslo
Members of the Storting
19th-century Norwegian politicians
Norwegian people of French descent
Recipients of the St. Olav's Medal
19th-century Norwegian lawyers